The ten Pan-European transport corridors were defined at the second Pan-European transport Conference in Crete, March 1994, as routes in Central and Eastern Europe that required major investment over the next ten to fifteen years. Additions were made at the third conference in Helsinki in 1997. Therefore, these corridors are sometimes referred to as the "Crete corridors" or "Helsinki corridors", regardless of their geographical locations.  

These development corridors are distinct from the Trans-European transport networks, which is a European Union project and include all major established routes in the European Union, although there are proposals to combine the two systems, since most of the involved countries now are members of the EU.

The corridors variously encompass road, rail and waterway routes.

See also
European long-distance paths
International E-road network

External links
UNECE: Maps of Pan-European Corridors (archived)
UNECE: Trans-European network for motorways (TEM) and rail (TER)
European Commission: Pan-European Corridors (obsolete link)